The electoral district of Eltham is an electoral district of the Victorian Legislative Assembly. It is an outer metropolitan electorate and contains Eltham, Lower Plenty as well as parts of Greensborough and Kangaroo Ground.

Eltham was created prior to the 1992 election and although it had a notional Labor margin of 4.3%, it was easily won by Wayne Phillips for the Liberal Party with a swing of over 14%. Phillips held the seat before being defeated in the 'Brackslide' of 2002.

The current member is Labor MP Vicki Ward.

Members for Eltham

Election results

Graphical summary

References

External links
 Electorate profile: Eltham District, Victorian Electoral Commission

Electoral districts of Victoria (Australia)
1992 establishments in Australia
City of Banyule
Shire of Nillumbik
Electoral districts and divisions of Greater Melbourne